Andrew Sznajder (pronounced: shnigh-der) (born 25 May 1967) is a Canadian former professional tour tennis player.

Sznajder achieved a career-high singles ranking of World No. 46 in September 1989. This was the highest any Canadian male was ranked in singles by the ATP until Greg Rusedski made it to No. 41 (before becoming a British citizen; subsequently in February 2011, Milos Raonic reached World No. 37). He was inducted into the Canada Tennis Hall of Fame.

Early life
Sznajder was born in Preston, Lancashire, England, moved to Canada at age seven, and is Jewish. He lives in Oakville, Ontario.

Tennis career
He was named Tennis Canada's "Most Improved Player" in 1985, and "Male Player of the Year" in 1986. Over his career, he was a five-time Canada national champion. Sznajder was a record six-time winner of the Canadian Closed singles championship and three-time Tennis Canada singles Player of the Year.

Prior to his pro career, Sznajder played college tennis at Pepperdine University for the Pepperdine Waves, and was a two-time All-American selection (1987 and 1988; he was # 3 in college rankings both years). His .800 won-lost percentage there (40–10) is the 6th-best in the school's history. In 1988, he won the Intercollegiate Tennis Association indoor individual championship. He turned pro in his second year.

The summer of 1989 was his best season as a pro – he won the Chicoutimi challenger event, reached the 3rd round at both the Stratton Mountain and Indianapolis Grand Prix events, the quarter finals of the Canadian Open and Los Angeles Grand Prix tournament, and the 2nd round of the U.S. Open. In July 1989 he defeated world # 24 Jay Berger in Stratton Mountain, 6–2, 2–6, 6–3, in August he beat # 23 Kevin Curren in Montreal, 6–2, 2–6, 6–3, and in September he upset # 8 Tim Mayotte in Los Angeles, 6–4, 3–6, 7–5.

In April 1990, Sznajder was a finalist of the Rio de Janeiro Grand Prix event. In November he upset world # 35 Karel Nováček 6–4, 6–3, in Brazil.

Upon retiring from the tour, Sznajder worked as Product Manager at PageNet Canada Inc. for 10 years. He then founded his own tennis health and racquet club software company, and directs his own tennis academy ASTA, and GSM Tennis Club, in Kitchener, Ontario.

He continued to play competitively, and captured the 2002 Ontario Indoor Championship.

After retiring, Sznajder became a top-ranking competitor on the ITF sanctioned Wilson/Mayfair Senior Circuit Over-35s.

In 2002 he was inducted into the Canada Tennis Hall of Fame.

Olympics
Sznajder represented Canada at the 1992 Summer Olympics, reaching the 2nd round.

Davis Cup
As a Canada Davis Cup team competitor, he had a career win-lose record of 14–10, all in singles, including a win and a loss in a losing tie to Spain in the first round of the 1991 World Group. It was Canada's first appearance in the World Group.

ATP career finals

Singles: 1 (1 runner-up)

ATP Challenger and ITF Futures finals

Singles: 4 (1–3)

Doubles: 1 (1–0)

Performance timeline

Singles

See also
List of select Jewish tennis players

References

External links
 
 
 

1967 births
Living people
Canadian expatriate sportspeople in the United States 
Canadian male tennis players

British emigrants to Canada

Jewish Canadian sportspeople
Jewish tennis players
Olympic tennis players of Canada
Sportspeople from Oakville, Ontario
Pepperdine Waves men's tennis players
Racket sportspeople from Ontario
Tennis players at the 1992 Summer Olympics